is a Japanese gravure idol. She is from Shizuoka Pref., Japan.

Activities

TV Programs 
 Double H (ダブルH), TV Tokyo
 Idol Revolution (アイドルレボリューション)
 Yoru Bijo (夜美女), Sun TV
 Speed Wagon no Nama-dashi (スピードワゴンのナマ出し), GyaO

DVDs 
 Ero Tenshi Yukina (エロ天使ゆきな), Bunkasha 2005
 EIGHT, Layfull 2006
 Repress, CLEO 2006
 Marionette (操り人形), CLEO 2007

Digital Photobook 
 EIGHT, Layfull 2006

External links
 The Back Room of Yukina Shirakawa(*・・*)  - Official Blog with her photographs, Since February 2006
 Sakura-gumi Blog: Yukina  - Former Official Blog with her photographs, from April 2005 to November 2006
 @Shitsure shimasu: Yukina Shirakawa  - June 2006
 The Release Anniversary of the DVD "Eight"  - March 2006

1985 births
Living people
Japanese gravure idols
Japanese television personalities